Knocking is a 2021 Swedish thriller film directed by Frida Kempff and written by Emma Broström, based on a short story by Johan Theorin. The film stars Cecilia Milocco, Krister Kern, Albin Grenholm, Ville Virtanen, and Alexander Salzberger.

The film had its world premiere at the 2021 Sundance Film Festival on January 30, 2021.

Plot
A traumatized woman seeks the truth behind mysterious knocking noises from the apartment above her.

Cast
The cast include:
 Cecilia Milocco
 Krister Kern
 Albin Grenholm
 Ville Virtanen
 Alexander Salzberger

Release
The film had its world premiere at the 2021 Sundance Film Festival on January 30, 2021 in the Midnight section.

Reception
On review aggregator website Rotten Tomatoes, 81% of 42 critics gave the film a positive review, with an average rating of 6.5/10. The critics consensus reads: "A slow-burning thriller that teeters between reality and delusion, Knocking views social issues through a blurred lens streaked with horror."

References

External links
 
 

Swedish thriller films
Swedish independent films
2021 thriller films
2021 independent films
2020s Swedish-language films